In polymer chemistry, a repeat unit or repeating unit (or mer) is a part of a polymer whose repetition would produce the complete polymer chain (except for the end-groups) by linking the repeat units together successively along the chain, like the beads of a necklace.

A repeat unit is sometimes called a mer (or mer unit). "Mer" originates from the Greek word meros, which means "a part". The word polymer derives its meaning from this, which means "many mers". A repeat unit (mer) is not to be confused with the term monomer, which refers to the small molecule from which a polymer is synthesized.

One of the simplest repeat units is that of the addition polymer polyvinyl chloride, 
-[CH2-CHCl]n-, whose repeat unit is -[CH2-CHCl]-. 
In this case the repeat unit has the same atoms as the monomer vinyl chloride CH2=CHCl. When the polymer is formed, the C=C double bond in the monomer is replaced by a C-C single bond in the polymer repeat unit, which links by two new bonds to adjoining repeat units.

In condensation polymers (see examples below), the repeat unit contains fewer atoms than the monomer or monomers from which it is formed.

The subscript "n" denotes the degree of polymerisation, that is, the number of units linked together. The molecular mass of the repeat unit, MR, is simply the sum of the atomic masses of the atoms within the repeat unit. The molecular mass of the chain is just the product nMR. Other than monodisperse polymers, there is normally a molar mass distribution caused by chains of different length.

In copolymers there are two or more types of repeat unit, which may be arranged in alternation, or at random, or in other more complex patterns.

Other vinyl polymers
Polyethylene may be considered either as -[CH2-CH2-]n- with a repeat unit of -[CH2-CH2]-, or as [-CH2-]n-, with a repeat unit of -[CH2]-. Chemists tend to consider the repeat unit as -[CH2-CH2]- since this polymer is made from the monomer ethylene (CH2=CH2).

More complex repeat units can occur in vinyl polymers -[CH2-CHR]n-, if one hydrogen in the ethylene repeat unit is substituted by a larger fragment R. Polypropylene -[CH2-CH(CH3)]n- has the repeat unit -[CH2-CH(CH3)]. Polystyrene has a chain where the substituent R is a phenyl group (C6H5), corresponding to a benzene ring minus one hydrogen: -[CH2-CH(C6H5)]n-, so the repeat unit is -[CH2-CH(C6H5)]-.

Condensation polymers: repeat unit and structural units

In many condensation polymers, the repeat unit contains two structural units related to the comonomers which have been polymerized. For example, in polyethylene terephthalate (PET or "polyester"), the repeat unit is -CO-C6H4-CO-O-CH2-CH2-O-. The polymer is formed by the condensation reaction of the two monomers  terephthalic acid (HOOC-C6H4-COOH) and ethylene glycol (HO-CH2-CH2-OH), or their chemical derivatives. The condensation involves loss of water, as an H is lost from each HO- group in the glycol, and an OH from each HOOC- group in the acid. The two structural units in the polymer are then considered to be -CO-C6H4-CO- and -O-CH2-CH2-O-.

References

Polymer chemistry